Victoria Shalet (born 9 December 1981) is an English former actress, known for her role as Harmony in the CBBC adaptation of the Dick King-Smith book The Queen's Nose.

Acting 
Victoria Jane Shalet was born in Enfield, Greater London, the only daughter of four children of Lawrence and Elaine Shalet. She is English on her mother's side and her father has Russian and Jewish heritage. She attended Southgate School. Shalet was sent to after-school acting, singing and dancing classes run by the local church, and the agent who ran the classes sent her for her first audition, for the BBC series Testimony of a Child. She won the role of Rosie Taylor and made her acting debut, the series airing in 1989.

She was next cast as Anna, the daughter of Miranda Richardson and Michael Kitchen's rowdy family, in Andrew Davies's Ball-Trap on the Cote Sauvage. In 1990 she attended an audition in America for Jim Henson, who cast her in Mother Goose Stories (where she appeared in two stories, Dorothy in The Giant and the title character in The Little Girl with the Curl). Shalet later played the daughter of King Minos in Henson production The Greek Myths.

By this time Shalet was finding work all over the world. In 1991 she guest starred in two episodes of ITV's Spatz and an episode of Dutch series Van Der Valk, and played her largest role to date in French film The Maid, playing the bratty daughter of Jacqueline Bisset. The following year she was cast in Shining Through alongside Michael Douglas, Melanie Griffith, John Gielgud and Liam Neeson (playing her father). That same year she acted in two BBC series, Love Hurts and Natural Lies. In 1993 she played a role in Goggle Eyes, an adaptation of Anne Fine's award-winning novel, and two years later appeared in the film Haunted.

In 1995 she was cast in the role she became best known for, the BBC children's series The Queen's Nose. In a podtail interview Shalet mentioned that Carol Wiseman (who directed the series) had previously worked with her on Goggle-Eyes and had wanted to work with the actress again, which led to Shalet being cast in The Queen's Nose. Shalet played the lead role of Harmony Parker, a lonely tomboy who is given a magic coin that grants wishes. The series quickly became a critical and popular success, winning a Royal Television Society Award and leading to Shalet appearing in various magazines and television interviews, including Blue Peter and Comic Relief. Shalet played the role for five years, juggling her filming commitments with her education (passing nine GCSEs), and eventually with other roles.

In 1997, after three years of playing Parker, she was cast in Andrew Davies' adaptation of his novel Getting Hurt, which aired the following year as part of BBC2's Obsessions season. The adult drama featured a scene of Nicholas Hope "photographically seducing her" which was described by the Times as one of the most powerful and chilling scenes in the drama. 1998 saw her make her stage debut, appearing in Philip Ridley's FairyTaleHeart at the Hampstead Theatre. She also acted in numerous radio dramas, including CS Lewis' The Last Battle in 1998 (as Jill Pole), Ballet Shoes (1999) (as Pauline Fossil), The River (2000) (as Valerie) and National Velvet (2001) (as Edwina Brown).

Shalet left The Queen's Nose in 2000, returning for a cameo in 2001. Her next role was in The Vice, her character ultimately becoming a significant character and being revealed as the daughter of Ken Stott's Inspector Pat Chappel. In a podtail interview she said that it was the role she had wanted the most in her adult career that she actually succeeded in getting. She had also auditioned for the roles in both Junk (1999) and As If (2001-2004), but lost out both times to the actress Jemima Rooper. 

Over the next few years, she guest starred in The Bill, Doctors (in 2009), Midsomer Murders (in 2002 and 2009), Jonathan Creek and MIT: Murder Investigation Team, and appeared in the films The Affair of the Necklace, Eroica (in a non-speaking role) and in David Jason's semi autobiographical drama The Quest. Despite critical acclaim for her stage role in the 2005 Salisbury Playhouse production of My Mother Said I Never Should and a 2007 fringe theatre production of The Things Good Men Do, screen roles dried up, and Shalet worked primarily in voice-overs and TV commercials, also acting in several short films.

Therapy 
By 2012 Shalet was becoming increasingly disenchanted with acting, and decided to change careers.

"From the age of six I was acting, but I got to my early twenties and realised my heart just wasn't in it. Then I had some therapy myself and it really did make me re-evaluate what I wanted from life. I did a foundation year in counselling and knew I wanted to take it further. The crunch came when I was accepted onto a training course that would qualify me to be a therapist. On the same day I got a call back from an audition to be a regular in ‘'Holby City'’. When I didn't get the part I saw it as a sign that I had to give up acting altogether to do the 4-year course. I had to make a choice and I've never regretted it."

Personal life 
Shalet is the second cousin of the actress Kacey Barnfield.

She previously dated reporter and economist Conor Woodman, who lists her among his dedications in his 2011 book Unfair Trade.

In 2013 she then became engaged to actor Adam James, and they married in September 2015. Their first child was born in September 2016, and she is stepmother to his daughter from a previous relationship.

Filmography

Television

Film

Video games

References

External links 

Shalet's therapy page

1981 births
English film actresses
English television actresses
English voice actresses
Living people
People educated at Southgate School
Actresses from London
English child actresses
20th-century English actresses
21st-century English actresses
British psychotherapists